Jinmyeong Girls' High School is a private girls high school located in Yangcheon-gu, Seoul, South Korea.

The school was originally established in 1906 with financial support from princess Consort Eom (Princess Sunheon) as part of king Gojong’s national salvation movement through educational movement. It was called an "imperial school" for this reason. Jinmyeong's purpose was to provide modern, westernized education for girls.

In 1910, the Japanese army took over the school during the Japanese occupation of Korea. In 1919 a group of girls, some of whom were students at Jinmyeong started an independence movement against the Japanese occupiers.

The school received criticism in 2022 for forcing students to write letters to soldiers, who sexualized the students.

Notable alumni
Noh Cheonmyeong, poet attended in the 1920s
Hwang Yun-suk, South Korea's first female judge
Eunha, lead vocalist of K-pop girl group, GFriend

Notable faculty
Na Hye-sok feminist, poet, writer, painter, educator, and journalist graduated from the school in 2013 and later taught at the school.

See also
Education in South Korea

References

External links
 Jinmyeong Girls' High School Homepage 
 Jinmyeong Girls' High School Alumni Association Homepage 

Education in South Korea
Educational organizations based in South Korea
Education in Seoul
High schools in South Korea
Educational institutions established in 1900
Girls' schools in South Korea
1900 establishments in Korea